Kandia Kouyaté (also known as Kandja Kouyaté, born in 1959 in Kita, Mali) is a Malian jelimuso (a female griot) and kora player; she has earned the prestigious title of ngara, and is sometimes called La dangereuse and La grande vedette malienne. Kouyaté's dense, emotional, hypnotic manner of singing and her lyrical talents have earned huge acclaim in Mali, though she remained relatively little known outside Africa, due to extremely limited availability of her recordings. Her home town of Kita is known for love songs, which form a large part of Kouyaté's repertoire.  She also sings praise songs.

Kouyaté's career began in the early 1980s, when she started using female choral vocals accompanying her. This practice was later picked up by stars like Mory Kante and Salif Keita, and is now an integral part of Malian music. In 1983, she recorded two vinyl discs, Amary Daou présente Kandia Kouyaté and Kandja Kouyaté et L’Ensemble Instrumental National du Mali. Her debut solo album is Kita Kan.

Kandia Kouyaté toured Europe in 1999 alongside Guinean singers Sekouba Bambino & Oumou Diabate and with a 12 piece West African ensemble that included kora, djembe, ngoni, balafon, bass, keyboards, backing vocals and percussion. The tour named as 'The Griot Groove Tour' included concerts in Germany, Austria, Norway, Sweden and the United Kingdom.

Kandia Kouyaté suffered a stroke in late 2004. In 2015, she recorded again.

Discography
Mayomba (1980, local cassette release)
Balassama / Sarama (1983, LP, produced by Amary Daou)	
Kandja Kouyaté et L’Ensemble Instrumental National du Mali (1983, LP)
OUA 84 (1984, local cassette release)
Projet Dabia (1987, local cassette release)
Sa Kunu Sa (1994, local cassette release)
Kita Kan (1999, CD, Stern's STCD 1088)
Biriko (2002, CD, Stern's STCD 1095)
Ngara (2009, compilation tracks 1999/1984/1981)
Symphonie Mandingue au Daniel Sorano a Dakar (2011, CD, Elite Production, BP2143)
 Renaissance, (2015)

References

External links

A brief bio

Malian Kora players
1959 births
20th-century Malian women singers
Living people
People from Kita, Mali
21st-century Malian women singers